The British capture of Senegal took place in 1758 during the Seven Years' War with France, as part of a concerted British strategy to weaken the French economy by damaging her international trade. To this end, a succession of small British military expeditions landed in Senegal and captured Gorée and Fort Saint Louis, the French slave fort located at Saint-Louis, seizing French vessels and supplies. By late 1758 the whole of the French colony on the Senegalese coast had been captured by the British, with administrative matters being handled by the first (and only) British Governor of Senegal, Lieutenant Colonel Richard Worge.

Background

The plan was devised by an American merchant Thomas Cumming who had previously visited West Africa, and extensively considered the possibilities for a British expedition. The plan was built around Britain's growing dominance on the Oceans which had dramatically reduced French sea power. A British naval force under Captain Henry Marsh would sail from England and head for the coast of West Africa, where it would land an amphibious force at the Senegal River. They would then capture the French fort at Saint-Louis. Cumming planned to raise support from local African forces, who would rendezvous with the British and attack the French.

The French settlements in Senegal had little strategic value, but they were important to France's global trade in slaves. They were also home to a substantial industry in natural gums. The principal object of the expedition was therefore to damage the French economy by cutting access to these industries. Such expeditions were part of Southern Secretary William Pitt's strategy of destroying France's capacity to continue the war by draining her of funds.

Expedition

Two hundred troops and two warships were to take part in the expedition. The forces departed from Plymouth in early 1758, and after a brief stop for supplies at Tenerife, they reached the coast of West Africa in April. Cumming had gone ashore to secure support amongst locals, and they launched a landward blockade of the fort. Marsh then put his troops ashore. The sudden arrival of British troops took the garrison completely by surprise. On 1 May the French surrendered the fort, and the resident traders swore allegiance to the British. Not a single Briton was killed in the taking of the settlement.

Cumming's ships returned home crammed with captured goods valued at hundreds of thousands of pounds. Pitt was extremely pleased at the ease with which the British forces had taken Saint-Louis. He was also impressed by the large quantity of Gum arabic brought back to Britain, as it provided a much cheaper source for silk-weavers. In the wake of the missions' success, two further expeditions were sent out that year, which captured the Island of Gorée and the French trading station on the Gambia. Pitt would have liked to have launched further expeditions but could not in the face of opposition from the Duke of Newcastle who feared that stripping the British Isles of troops would leave them vulnerable to invasion.

Aftermath
Along with expeditions against Canada, the West Indies and Philippines, the capture of Senegal demonstrated the new global reach of the Royal Navy and the increasingly global nature of European conflicts – as a consequence historians have labeled it the first 'world war'. Ownership of the West African possessions became a major source of contention between Britain and France during the peace talks that led to the 1763 Treaty of Paris. The negotiations centred on a potential return of some of the captured outposts. Britain was keen to hold of the Senegalese mainland, but willing to return Gorée. Ultimately, Britain kept Saint-Louis and the Senegal mainland as a part of British Senegambia.

The British intended to build up their presence in West Africa, and intended to use Senegal as a starting point for this. To protect their new possession, they raised the Africa Corps, a special unit of troops under the command of Charles O'Hara. The French were unhappy about the loss of this valuable colony, and planned to recapture it. In 1764, the French launched incursions against the coast of Senegal from Gorée, angering the British cabinet. In 1779, during the American War of Independence a French force landed and seized Saint-Louis, and Senegal was ceded to them by Britain as part of the Treaty of Paris that ended the war in 1783. French control remained sporadic until its final departure in 1852.

See also
 France in the Seven Years' War
 History of Senegal

References

Bibliography
 Anderson, Fred. Crucible of War: The Seven Years' War and the fate of Empire in British North America, 1754–1766. Faber and Faber, 2000.
 Brown, Peter Douglas. William Pitt, Earl of Chatham: The Great Commoner. George Allen & Unwin, 1978.
 Dull, Jonathan R. The French Navy and the Seven Years' War. University of Nebraska, 2005.
 McLynn, Frank. 1759: The Year Britain Became Master of the World. Pimlico, 2005.
 Simms, Brendan. Three Victories and a Defeat: The Rise and Fall of the First British Empire. Penguin Books (2008)

Conflicts in 1758
Battles of the Seven Years' War
Battles involving Great Britain
British capture of Senegal
Battles involving France
British capture of Senegal
British capture of Senegal